Radioimmunodetection is an imaging technique using radiolabeled antibodies.

References

Nuclear medicine